Kasif or Kaşif may refer to:
Kaşif ROUV, a Turkish remotely operated underwater vehicle
Kasif, Israel, future planned city in Negev, Israel

People
Kasif (musician) (1956-2016), American multi-instrumentalist
Ahmet Kaşif (born 1950), Turkish Cypriot politician
Kaşif Kozinoğlu (1955-2011), Turkish intelligence officer
Tolga Kaşif (born 1992), British-born conductor and composer
Ofer Kasif (born 1964), Israeli politician

See also
Kashif The name
 Kashif (disambiguation)